The John Hoxsie House, also known as the Old Kenyon Farm, is an historic farmstead in Richmond, Rhode Island.  The farm is a  parcel of land accessed via a long private drive on the east side of Richmond Town House Road (Rhode Island Route 112), just north of Pinecrest Road, and is a rare, virtually intact, example of a 19th-century farmstead.  The main house, a -story Cape style structure, was built in 1784 by John Hoxsie.

The property was listed on the National Register of Historic Places in 1978.

See also
National Register of Historic Places listings in Washington County, Rhode Island

References

Richmond, Rhode Island
Houses in Washington County, Rhode Island
Houses completed in 1784
Houses on the National Register of Historic Places in Rhode Island
National Register of Historic Places in Washington County, Rhode Island